The women's team event at the 2012 Summer Olympics in London, United Kingdom, took place at the Aquatics Centre from 9 to 10 August. Russia maintained its dominance in the sport, as the team delivered a nearly perfect, complex choreography for another gold medal at its fourth consecutive Olympics, having received a powerful, composite score of 197.030 by the judges. Meanwhile, the Chinese squad resisted the challenge from Spain on a historical breakthrough to add a silver in the event with 194.010, edging the Spaniards out of the pool to accept the bronze for a total score of 193.120.

Eight teams competed, each consisting of eight swimmers (from a total team of nine swimmers). There was a single round of competition. Each team presents two routines: a technical routine and a free routine. The technical routine consists of twelve required elements, which must be completed in order and within a time of between 2 minutes 35 seconds and 3 minutes 5 seconds. The free routine has no restrictions other than time; this routine must last between 3 minutes 45 seconds and 4 minutes 15 seconds.

For each routine, the team is judged by two panels of five judges each. One panel is the technical jury, the other is the artistic jury. Each judge gives marks of between 0 and 10. The highest and lowest score from each panel are dropped, leaving a total of six scores which are then summed to give the routine's score. The scores of the two routines are then added to give a final score for the team

Schedule 
All times are UTC+1

Results

References

External links
NBC Olympics

Synchronized swimming at the 2012 Summer Olympics
2012 in women's sport
Women's events at the 2012 Summer Olympics